The 2010 Darra Adam Khel mosque bombing occurred on 5 November 2010, when at least 66 people, including children, were killed by a suicide bomb attack in a mosque in the town of Darra Adam Khel, Khyber Pakhtunkhwa, Pakistan. 80 others were wounded as worshippers offered Jumu'ah, the congregational Friday prayers. The mosque, which belonged to the predominant Sunni denomination, was frequented by tribal elders; according to sources, the bomber may have been targeting a local politician who was known for speaking out against the Taliban. The attack was the deadliest after the September 2010 Quetta bombing in Balochistan, which targeted a procession of Shi'a Muslims.
Just a few hours after the attack, three grenades were thrown at another mosque in Peshawar; the blasts killed 5 and wounded 24.

References

2010 murders in Pakistan
Mass murder in 2010
Mosque bombings by Islamists
Terrorist incidents in Pakistan in 2010
Islamic terrorist incidents in 2010
Suicide bombings in Khyber Pakhtunkhwa
Mosque bombings in Pakistan